Gene Pitney Sings Just for You is American singer Gene Pitney's third album, released on the Musicor label in 1963. It included the single "Mecca" which reached #12 on the U.S. Hot 100 and was a top 10 hit in Australia and Canada.

Track listing 
"Teardrop by Teardrop" (Bob Halley) – 2:19
"Mecca" (John Gluck Jr., Neval Nader) – 2:21
"Cornflower Blue" (Mac David, Sherman Edwards) – 2:49
"Not Responsible" (Ben Raleigh, Mark Barkan) – 2:31
"The Angels Got Together" (Aaron Schroeder) – 2:46
"Don't Let the Neighbours Know" (Gluck, Nader) – 2:18 
"Ship True Love Goodbye" (Barkan, Nader) – 2:25
"House Without Windows" (Fred Tobias, Lee Pockriss) – 2:27
"Aladdin's Lamp" (Gene Pitney) – 2:28
"Time and the River" (Schroeder, Wally Gold) – 2:32
"Peanuts, Popcorn, and Crackerjacks" (Artie Wayne, Raleigh) – 2:35
"Tell the Moon to Go to Sleep" (Alan Schackner, Gloria Shayne) – 2:21

References

1963 albums
Gene Pitney albums
Musicor Records albums